The 2006 Swedish Golf Tour, known as the Telia Tour for sponsorship reasons, was the 21st season of the Swedish Golf Tour, a series of professional golf tournaments for women held in Sweden and Finland.

Anna Berg was the only player to win two events, and Christine Hallström won the Order of Merit.

Schedule
The season consisted of 16 tournaments played between May and October, where one event was held in Finland.

See also
2006 Swedish Golf Tour (men's tour)

References

External links
Official homepage of the Swedish Golf Tour

Swedish Golf Tour (women)
Swedish Golf Tour (women)